Parts of the Process is a greatest hits album by the British electronica band Morcheeba released in 2003 by China Records in the UK, and Reprise Records in North America. The album reached number 6 on the UK Albums Chart.

The album includes all of the single releases by the band, with the exception of "Shoulder Holster". It also contains the non-single tracks "Over and Over" (from the 1998 album Big Calm) and "What New York Couples Fight About" (from the 2002 album Charango), as well as the previously unreleased songs "What's Your Name" and "Can't Stand It".

"What's Your Name", which features a rap verse by Big Daddy Kane, was released as a single to accompany the album, supported by a video.

Tracks on the album were remastered to make them sound louder than their originals.

Around the time of the release, Morcheeba also released the DVD Morcheeba: From Brixton to Beijing, which contained performances of a large catalogue of Morcheeba's songs.

Track listing

Charts

Certifications

References

2003 greatest hits albums
Morcheeba albums
Warner Records compilation albums
Trip hop compilation albums